Honduras participated in the 2015 Parapan American Games.

Competitors
The following table lists Honduras's delegation per sport and gender.

Athletics

Men

Powerlifting

Men

Swimming

Men

Women

References

2015 in Honduran sport
Nations at the 2015 Parapan American Games
Honduras at the Pan American Games